Sembawang Public Library is a public library located in Sun Plaza shopping mall at Sembawang, Singapore. It was officially opened on 11 August 2000 by K. Shanmugam, then Minister of Parliament for Sembawang Group Representation Constituency (Chong Pang). The library relocated to Level 5 of Sun Plaza Shopping Mall, and was reopened on 5 November 2014 by Associate Professor Muhammad Faishal Ibrahim, Parliamentary Secretary, Ministry of Health & Ministry of Transport.

The library occupies the entire fifth storey with a floor area of 1,607 square metres. It serves residents in the North West areas of Lim Chu Kang, Mandai, Sembawang, Simpang, Sungei Kadut, Woodlands and Yishun, and has a wide-ranging collection size of 150,000 for users of all age groups.

Access
The library is served by the Sembawang MRT station and Sembawang Bus Interchange near Sun Plaza shopping mall.

See also
 List of libraries in Singapore

References

External links
 National Library Board, Singapore
 Sembawang Public Library

2000 establishments in Singapore
Libraries established in 2000
Libraries in Singapore
Sembawang